Wishmaster 2: Evil Never Dies is a 1999 direct-to-video fantasy horror film and a sequel to the 1997 film Wishmaster. The film premiered on television on March 12, 1999, and was released on DVD on August 17, 1999 and bundled with the first film.

Plot 

During an attempted robbery of a museum, the fire opal that contains the Djinn is accidentally released by a stray gunshot. One of the burglars, a young woman named Morgana Truscott (Holly Fields), steals the gem and is forced to abandon her boyfriend during the escape. The Djinn escapes and kills the remaining burglar when he accidentally wishes he'd never been born. As the police enter the museum, the Djinn (Andrew Divoff) finishes forming into its full size, whereupon it assumes its Nathaniel Demarest persona and surrenders to the police. Demarest is put in a holding cell, where he kills a fellow prisoner who wishes to get out of the cell. Meanwhile, Morgana has been having dreams where she sees glimpses of the Djinn in his true form. Later Morgana goes to Church to visit the priest tending the church, a man named Gregory (Paul Johannson), a former lover of Morgana's. In prison, Demarest is confronted by Butz (Rhino Michaels) and his two henchmen, the Tiger brothers (James Kim and Simon Kim). Butz runs all "underground business" at the prison, and gives Demarest a "friendly" warning that he is going to be watching him. Eventually they meet again, with Butz wanting to join forces with him, but Demarest rejects the offer. Believing Demarest to be a dealer, he asks for his drugs, any drugs on which he can 'get wasted...stomped into the ground'. Demarest grants the latter and Butz is savagely beaten by his own underlings. Soon Demarest is temporarily sent to solitary, suspected of instigating a spate of recent troubles.

Meanwhile Morgana continues to have her nightmares before she does research on Persian mythology, particularly the Persian deity Ahura Mazda, who bound the Djinn. Gregory arrives at her loft, to check in. Morgana opens up just a little, telling Gregory she hasn't been sleeping well, and has nightmares about a voice telling her to "fulfill the prophecy", and confesses to the robbery and the murder of the guard. Morgana goes to the prison to visit Demarest. She demands to know why he confessed to the robbery, and he says it was so she wouldn't have to, and admits to not having to be in prison long, before showing his true form, driving Morgana away. As she continues to do research, she learns more on the legend of the Djinn, and the threat he poses. Morgana goes to see Gregory the next day to tell him about her findings. Gregory rides to the prison with Morgana and confronts Demarest, demanding he leave Morgana alone. Demarest turns the tables on Gregory by duplicating Morgana's voice, speaking seductively to Gregory.

Later that evening, Morgana begins undergoing a number of rituals aimed at purifying her soul, as only someone pure of heart can banish the Djinn back into his prison. Back at the prison, Demarest kills the prison warden, and escapes with a Russian inmate he befriended named Osip (Oleg Vidov). Osip brings Demarest to Pushkin, a Russian-American mob boss whom Osip despises, and tells him that Demarest is a Wishmaster who can give Pushkin anything he wants. But Pushkin brushes them off, but as he is leaving, Demarest asks if Pushkin has any enemies he would like to see eliminated, and a rival crime boss named Moustafa is brought up. The mere mention of Moustafa's name sends Pushkin into a rage. Carelessly, fueled by his anger, Pushkin wishes to have Moustafa's head, unexpectedly gaining his appearance, thus rendering Pushkin nonexistent, and Osip takes over as the ruler of his criminal empire.  Morgana rushes into the club room, shooting Demarest, but she and Osip freeze in horror as this only causes the Djinn to assume his true form, as he mocks her foolishness.

Gregory finds Morgana praying feverishly at the church altar, and sobbing inconsolably. She confesses to Gregory that she tried to kill Demarest and then saw the Djinn's true face. She laments that her guilt, the blood of the innocent man she killed at the art gallery heist, can never be washed away, and so she can never hope to fight the Djinn. Gregory patiently counsels her, that God is on their side. It turns out Morgana is invulnerable when she attempts suicide so the Djinn can not grant her the three necessary wishes. Gregory has compiled more notes, including the incantation used by the alchemist who imprisoned the Djinn. Morgana has doubts in their plan, but as Gregory says it is the only one they have. Despite his initial reticence, Morgana and Gregory end up having sex.

In Vegas, the Djinn begins granting wishes to the casino patrons in order to collect the remaining required souls. As Morgana and Gregory ride a cab through Las Vegas to the casino Demarest is operating out of, the Djinn stands in his office in his true form where he claims the souls everyone gave up through their wishes. Noting that Demarest has left the fire opal on his desk, Gregory quietly inches toward it while Demarest is speaking to Morgana. Demarest catches him and Gregory wishes for the Djinn to be sent back to hell. The Djinn grants his wish - with the caveat that they come along with him - and they're transported inside the fire opal where Gregory is crucified and killed after Morgana wishes for him to be released. Morgana angrily wishes for a world without evil; the Djinn says without evil, good cannot exist. He warns her that he is losing his patience with her. Morgana tries desperately to resist the Djinn's will. Morgana's fears suddenly quiet and she asks the Djinn the meaning of fulfilling the prophecy. The Djinn impatiently recites the prophecy to her, that the one who wakes the Djinn shall have three wishes; upon the granting of all three, the race of Djinn will reign over the Earth. Due to a slip of the tongue, Morgana realizes the meaning of the prophecy, and wishes for the guard she killed to be alive again. After receiving a vision of the guard alive and well, her pureness of heart restored, she takes the Djinn's fire opal and intones the alchemist's chant, "Nib Sugaroth Baheim". The Djinn is again banished and all the victims returned to life.

Cast 
 Holly Fields as Morgana Truscott
 Andrew Divoff as The Djinn / Nathaniel Demerest
 Paul Johansson as Gregory
 Tom 'Tiny' Lister as Guard
 Rhino Michaels as Butz
 James Kim as James Tiger
 Simon Kim as Simon Tiger
 Oleg Vidov as Osip Krutchkov
 Levan Uchaneishvili as Pushkin
 Timo Flloko as Moustafa

Reception
The film received mainly negative reviews. On Rotten Tomatoes the film has an approval rating of 9% based on reviews from 11 critics.

During his interview for the documentary, "Behind the Curtain Part II" (2012), writer/director, Jack Sholder, had this to say about the film: 
"That's one that I have very mixed feelings about because there are parts of it that I really like, but I think, all in all, it's a little dumb. To tell you the truth, I haven't seen it since I, uh, made it. When I was making it, I thought it was good. I thought a lot of it was kind of funny or clever. I definitely feel it has merit. From what I can gather, it's one of those films that divides people. Some people don't like it, others do. And, you know, it was also a sequel to a movie that I thought wasn't a good movie at all. It's a movie that I did, and I don't regret doing. You know, there's a lot of stuff that I think is pretty good from it. You know, like the scene from the casino I thought was pretty good. Maybe it comes off as being silly." -Jack Sholder, Writer/Director, "Wishmaster 2: Evil Never Dies" (1999). Source, "Behind the Curtain Part II" (2012).

References

External links
 

Direct-to-video horror films
Direct-to-video sequel films
1999 horror films
1999 fantasy films
Genies in film
Films directed by Jack Sholder
1999 films
Artisan Entertainment films
Films about wish fulfillment
Wishmaster films